Stage Point is a promontory in Manomet in Plymouth, Massachusetts, United States. In 1643 John Hewes and William Paddy were given permission to erect fishing stages on the point, and this is the origin of its name.

See also
 Massachusetts Bay Colony

References

Pre-statehood history of Massachusetts